The 2022 Bengaluru Open was a professional tennis tournament played on hard courts. It was the fourth edition of the tournament which was part of the 2022 ATP Challenger Tour. It took place in Bangalore, India from 7 to 13 February 2022.

Singles main-draw entrants

Seeds

 1 Rankings are as of 31 January 2022.

Other entrants
The following players received wildcards into the singles main draw:
  S D Prajwal Dev
  Saketh Myneni
  Rishi Reddy

The following players received entry from the qualifying draw:
  Antoine Bellier
  Gabriel Décamps
  Borna Gojo
  Malek Jaziri
  Arjun Kadhe
  Rio Noguchi

The following player received entry as a lucky loser:
  Steven Diez

Champions

Singles

  Tseng Chun-hsin def.  Borna Gojo 6–4, 7–5.

Doubles

  Saketh Myneni /  Ramkumar Ramanathan def.  Hugo Grenier /  Alexandre Müller 6–3, 6–2.

References

2022 ATP Challenger Tour
2022
2022 in Indian tennis
February 2022 sports events in India